"We Got Love"  is a song by English DJ Sigala, featuring vocals from British singer and songwriter Ella Henderson and uncredited backing vocals from English singer and songwriter Anne-Marie. The song was released as a digital download on 1 November 2019, the DJ's birthday. The song peaked at number 42 on the UK Singles Chart.

Background
In an interview with Hits Radio, Sigala admitted he's "Always loved Ella's voice and vibe, she's a very likeable person." Henderson then said, "I'm a huge fan of your music, and I think as soon as I was sent the track and I heard it, it just made me feel super positive and I couldn't wait to vocal it, and be a part of it!"

The song incorporates a sample from the Rhythim is Rhythim classic Strings of Life whose songwriter (Michael James) and producer (Derrick May) are given writer credits.

Charts

Weekly charts

Year-end charts

Certifications

Release history

References

2019 songs
2019 singles
Sigala songs
Ella Henderson songs

Songs written by Sigala
Songs written by Ella Henderson
Songs written by Anne-Marie (singer)
Songs written by Digital Farm Animals